On There are 552 engineering colleges in Tamil Nadu as of July 2014. Out of 552 engineering colleges affiliated to Anna University, 14 of them are Government/aided colleges, 33 of them are Autonomous colleges and the rest are self-financing colleges and four are University departments within Anna University.

Anna University Colleges 

Anna University - Guindy, Chennai Circle:

Anna University - Tharamani, Chennai Circle:

Anna University - Trichy Circle:

Anna University - Madurai Circle:

Anna University - Tirunelveli Circle:

Tamil Nadu Government Engineering & Technology Colleges

Government-aided colleges 

PSG College of Technology
Coimbatore Institute of Technology
Thiagarajar College of Engineering

Central Autonomous institutes

Central Government institutions affiliated to Tamil Nadu State University 

 Central Electro Chemical Research Institute
 Central Leather Research Institute

District wise 
Chennai
 Loyola-ICAM College of Engineering and Technology
BSA Crescent Engineering College 
R.M.K. Engineering College

Coimbatore 
 PSG College of Technology
 Coimbatore Institute of Technology
 Government College of Technology, Coimbatore
 Kumaraguru College of Technology
 KPR Institute of Engineering and Technology
 Sri Ramakrishna Engineering College
 Karpagam College of Engineering
 Sri Krishna College of Engineering & Technology
 SNS College of Technology
 Dr. Mahalingam College of Engineering and Technology
 Tamil Nadu College of Engineering
 Rathinam technical campus of technology
 Dhanalakshmi Srinivasan College of Engineering

Cuddalore 
 CK College of Engineering
  MRK Institute of Technology
  Dr.Navalar Nedunchezhiyan College of Engineering
  Krishnaswamy College of Engineering and Technology
  St.Anne College of Engineering and Technology

Madurai
Thiagarajar College of Engineering
Velammal College of Engineering and Technology
Kamaraj College of Engineering and Technology
Solamalai College of Engineering
P.T.R College of Engineering and Technology
Fathima Michael College of Engineering and Technology
Latha Mathavan Engineering College
Ultra College of Engineering and Technology
Vaigai College of Engineering

Erode
Kongu Engineering College
Bannari Amman Institute of Technology
Erode Sengunthar Engineering College
Velalar College of Engineering and Technology

Kanchipuram
 Thangavelu Engineering College (TEC)
 Kings Engineering College (KEC)
 Sri Sivasubramaniya Nadar College of Engineering
 Sri Sai Ram Engineering College
 Sri Sairam Institute of Technology
 Chennai Institute of Technology
 Adhiparasakthi Engineering College
 Mohamed sathak aj college of engineering

Kanniyakumari 
 Arunachala College Of Engineering For Women

Karur 
 M.Kumarasamy College of Engineering
 Chettinad College of Engineering and Technology

Krishnagiri 
 Government College of Engineering, Bargur

Namakkal 
 Selvam College of Technology
 J.K.K.Nattraja College of Engineering and Technology
 Sengunthar Engineering College (Autonomous)

Mayiladuthurai 
  A.V.C College of Engineering

Nagapattinam 
  E.G.S Pillay Engineering College
  Sembodai Rukumani College of Engineering college
  Sir issac Newton College of Engineering and Technology
  Arifa Institute of Engineering and Technology
  Prime college of Architecture and Planning

Ramanathapuram 
 Mohamed Sathak Engineering College
 Syed Ammal Engineering College 

Salem 
 AVS Engineering College
 Government College of Engineering, Salem
 Sona College of Technology
 Tagore Institute of Engineering and Technology
Thanjavur
 Parisutham Institute of Technology & Science
Thirunelveli
 Francis Xavier Engineering College
 Government College of Engineering, Tirunelveli

Thiruvallur 
 Apollo Engineering College
 Prathyusha Engineering College
 Saveetha Engineering College

Thiruvannamalai 
 Arulmigu Meenakshi Amman College of Engineering

Thiruvarur 
 Anjalai Ammal Mahalingam Engineering College

Trichirappalli
 Vetri Vinayaha College of Engineering and Technology

Tuticorin
 St.Mother Theresa Engineering College
 Dr.sivanthi adithanar Engineering college tiruchendur

Vellore 
 Thanthai Periyar Government Institute Of Technology
 C. Abdul Hakeem College of Engineering & Technology
 Kingston Engineering College
 Global Institute Of Technology
 Annai Meera Engineering College
 Sree Kirshna Engineering College
 Ranipetai Engineering College
 Priyadharshini Engineering College
 Bharathi Dhasan Engineering College

List of Autonomous Engineering Colleges

 PSG College of Technology
 Coimbatore Institute of Technology
 Government College of Technology, Coimbatore
 Kumaraguru College of Technology
SENGUNTHAR Engineering College, Tiruchengode
 KPR Institute of Engineering and Technology
 Kongu Engineering College
 Bannari Amman Institute of Technology
 Government College of Engineering, Salem
 Thiagarajar College of Engineering 
 Dr. Mahalingam College of Engineering and Technology
 Sri Krishna College of Engineering & Technology
Sri Sairam College of Engineering & Technology
 Sri Ramakrishna Engineering College
 St. Joseph's College of Engineering
 SNS College of Technology
 Sona College of Technology
 Sethu Institute of Technology
 Karpagam College of Engineering 
 Jerusalem College of Engineering
 Erode Sengunthar Engineering College
 M.Kumarasamy College of Engineering
 National Engineering College
 Mepco Schlenk Engineering College
 Adhiyamaan College of Engineering
 K. S. Rangasamy College of Technology
  velalar college of engineering and technology
 Nandha Engineering College
 Mahendra Engineering College
 Sri Sivasubramaniya Nadar College of Engineering
 Sri Venkateswara College of Engineering
 Easwari Engineering College
E.G.S Pillay Engineering College
 Rajalakshmi Engineering College
 Velammal Engineering College
 Valliammai Engineering College
 IFET College of Engineering
 Velalar College of Engineering and Technology
 Saveetha Engineering College
 Sri Shakthi Institute of Engineering & Technology, Coimbatore
 Muthayammal Engineering College, Rasipuram
  Hindusthan College Of Engineering And Technology , Coimbatore
Dhanalakshmi Srinivasan Engineering College, Perambalur
Rathinam technical campus of technology,coimbatore
Paavai Engineering College

See also 
 List of Tamil Nadu Government educational institutions
 List of Tamil Nadu Government Engineering Colleges

References 

 
Engineering colleges
Tamil Nadu